Tippecanoe Valley High School is a high school located in Akron, Indiana. Home of the Vikings.

See also
 List of high schools in Indiana

References

External links
 Official Website

Public high schools in Indiana
Buildings and structures in Kosciusko County, Indiana